Zahra Dowlatabadi (Persian: زهرا دولت آبادی; born September 14, 1962) is an Iranian-born American filmmaker and film producer.

Biography 
Zahra Dowlatabadi received her master's degree at University of Southern California (USC) in film studies in 1986. Dowlatabadi line-produced two DTVs entitled: The Jetsons; Robo-Wrestlemania and Scooby-Doo! Shaggy's Showdown released in 2017. Prior to joining WB, she served as producer on seasons 2 and 3 of Comedy Central's adult comedy, Brickleberry at Bento Box Entertainment. She was tapped by ASIFA-Hollywood to produce the 39th Annie Awards which took place at UCLA’s Royce Hall on Feb. 4th 2012.

Dowlatabadi’s most recent live action credit is as writer & director on a documentary short called Parthian (2016) and prior to that she was executive producer on the documentary titled Lady of Roses (2008) written, produced and directed by Mojtaba Mirtahmasb.

Dowlatabadi partnered with Catherine Winder to write Producing Animation. Published by Focal Press in 2001 and translated in Chinese, and Korean, the 2nd edition of Producing Animation was released in Sept. 2011.

In 1996, Dowlatabadi first started as a production manager and was later promoted to associate producer on Warner Bros. Feature Animation Studio’s Quest for Camelot. She also managed a small team to help Space Jam meet its production goals.  Additionally she produced a PSA for Unicef on the topic of Children’s Rights.

Prior to working at Warner Bros. Feature Animation, Dowlatabadi first served as co-producer and then producer on the Land Before Time sequels at Universal Cartoon Studios for which she won an Annie award in 1996. She also assisted director Joe Johnston on The Pagemaster.

In 1991 Dowlatabadi joined the feature animation team at Hanna-Barbera Studios.  She worked on Once Upon a Forest where she learned to navigate animation production in studios located in Spain, Argentina, Australia, Denmark and Taiwan.

From animation to documentary production, Dowlatabadi was hired to work with director Albert Magnoli and producer Alastair Bates to create a short film about Prince in 1989. Beforehand, she took the job of the production manager on the TV series Peter Pan and the Pirates. Subsequent to that project, Dowlatabadi joined Disney Television Production as an associate producer on Goof Troop.

Dowlatabadi entered the animation world when she joined the world-famous Japanese animation studio Tokyo Movie Shinsha, serving as an art coordinator for 65 episodes of Bionic Six and then as the post-production coordinator for Visionaries. She was the production manager on the feature adaptation of Winsor McCay’s Little Nemo working with Brian Froud, Corny Cole, Ken Anderson and Ken Mundie.

References

External links

Producing Animation

Iranian film directors
Living people
1962 births
University of Southern California alumni
Iranian emigrants to the United States